Playing Out: Songs For Children & Robots is the ninth studio album by Kathryn Williams, released on CAW Records on 9 September 2010. It is a collaboration with Anna Spencer (formerly of punk band Delicate Vomit) with both using their own sons as a focus group

Critical reception
The Guardian regarded the songs "sufficiently simple for a child to love but with enough depth that they don't drive parents mad".

Track listing 
 Robots In The Rain—3:25 
 Disco Teeth—2:50  
 Rainy Day—1:12  
 Hopscotch—3:24  
 Emergency—2:53  
 Sweet On The Floor—1:53 
 Lets Dance On The Moon—3:16 
 Spooky Way Home—3:05  
 How Hot Is A Toad?  -- 2:16 
 Pirates On The Bus—2:36 
 Illegal—3:09

Personnel 
 Kathryn Williams – vocals & guitar
 Anna Spencer – vocals & instruments
 Simon Edwards—double bass
 Gayle Hutchinson—viola

Recording details 
 Illustrations by Sammi Solar
 Engineered  by Kathryn Williams
 Mastered by Denis Blackham
 Mixed by David Wrench

References 

Kathryn Williams albums
2010 albums